Strange Factories is a 2013 British experimental horror film written, directed by John Harrigan and produced by the British immersive theatre and production collective FoolishPeople. The film is an example of interactive cinema, featuring a mixture of film and live performance. It centers on a writer, who travels through a mysterious landscape filled with cultists, hallucinatory visions, and a mysterious factory that emanates a strange humming sound.

Plot

A tormented writer named Victor journeys through a mysterious, dream-like landscape in search of a group of performers from a theater that mysteriously burned down. As he continues through the landscape, he begins to uncover a bizarre cult under the hallucinatory influence of a nearby factory, and a sinister pact he once made with its owner. All the while he is tormented by visions and a strange humming sound that emanates from the factory.

Cast 
John Harrigan as Victor
Annalisa Astarita as Hettie
Rachael Blyth as Emma
Tereza Kamenicka as Lady Thayn
David Monard as Sam
Claire Louise Oliver as Jessica
Lucy Harrigan as Rose
Claire Tregellas as Jess
Mark Postgate as Arlec
Xanadu Xero as Marina

Reception

Ain't It Cool News gave the film a positive review, writing, "Strange Factories may not be for the more literal-minded of horror fans. But fans of the theatrical side of performances, the technical side of writing, and the appreciators of the surreal and offbeat will find a lot of things to appreciate." Sarah Stewart from The Londonist praised the film's atmosphere, suspense, and innovative blending of celluloid and live-action performance. Rachel Simm from The Latest Brighton gave the film three out of five stars, praising the film's atmosphere, and suspense, calling it "eerie, unsettling and somewhat puzzling".

References

External links 
 
 
 
 

2013 films
2013 horror films
2010s avant-garde and experimental films
2013 independent films
British avant-garde and experimental films
British horror films
British independent films
British black-and-white films
Crowdfunded films
Films shot in Hampshire
Indiegogo projects
Interactive films
2010s English-language films
2010s British films